The National Party is a minor far-right nationalist political party in Ireland. The party was founded in 2016 and has no elected representatives.

History

Formation 
The party was founded in 2016, by Justin Barrett as party president and James Reynolds as party vice president. The National Party had planned to hold its press launch in the Merrion Hotel in Dublin but the event was cancelled by the hotel, which subsequently said it had done so for "public safety reasons". There had been much adverse reaction online to the announcement of the launch.

Barrett, who was raised in County Tipperary, has a background in anti-abortion and anti-immigration politics, formerly being a leading figure in Youth Defence and campaigning against the Treaty of Nice. Barrett attracted media attention due to his participation in events in both Germany and Italy organised by far right parties, the National Democratic Party and Forza Nuova, respectively, in the 1990s. Barrett has denied sharing their far right views and said he attended these events in his capacity as an anti-abortion campaigner. In 2016, in an interview where he incorrectly overstated the levels of migration to Ireland by a factor of three, he called his attendance at these meetings "a mistake".

Reynolds, from County Longford, was the County Longford affiliate for Youth Defence in the early 1990s. He was associated with the Libertas Ireland political party in 2009, and campaigned for a no vote in the Fiscal Compact referendum in 2012 as chairman of the small Farmers for No group.  Reynolds was previously the Longford county chairman of the Irish Farmers' Association, and national treasurer of the Irish Cattle and Sheep Farmers Association.  He was suspended from the IFA in 2012 for "bringing the county executive into disrepute". In March 2017 he secured a temporary High Court injunction preventing his dismissal as national treasurer of the ICSA, but the High Court upheld his dismissal from the role in June 2017.
  
The party held its first Ardfheis in November 2017, at the Trump International Golf Links and Hotel Ireland in County Clare. Approximately fifty delegates attended. Barrett criticised Fine Gael in his speech for not calling its annual conference an ardfheis. John Wilson, a guest speaker from County Cavan, challenged homophobic comments made by deputy leader James Reynolds. Barrett defended Reynolds' comments and reportedly answered in the affirmative when asked by Wilson whether the National Party was "only for straight Irish people". Wilson then walked out in protest at the comments.

Abortion Never campaign 
Abortion Never was formed as a No campaign by the National Party in March 2018 to contest the 2018 referendum to legislate for abortion. Abortion Never presented itself as "an Irish nationalist anti-abortion campaign." At the launch of the campaign, Barrett stated that if the abortion referendum passed, it would lead to euthanasia for the elderly; "It doesn't just begin with abortion and stop there. It ends in euthanasia, because they already have a plan. You see discussions in the newspapers sometimes, 'What are we going to do about the pensions crisis?'". At the same event, he called for the abortion referendum campaign to be "as divisive as possible". The referendum was ultimately approved by 66.4% of voters.

Elections
In April 2019, the party was added to the Register of Political Parties for Dáil, local and European elections, but did not field candidates in the 2019 local elections or 2019 European elections.

The National Party contested an election for the first time at the 2020 general election. It put forward ten candidates, although party leader Justin Barrett did not run himself. No candidates were elected, with a share of first preference votes between 0.49% (224 votes) and 1.74% (983 votes) in their respective constituencies. Party vice president, James Reynolds, had 1.74% of first preference votes (983 votes) in the Longford–Westmeath constituency.

Justin Barrett was included on the ballot for the 2021 Dublin Bay South by-election. Barrett received 176 votes, 0.67% of the first preference votes, a significant decrease on previous election results. He was eliminated after the third count.

Standards in Public Office Commission
In November 2020, the Standards in Public Office Commission announced that the National Party were one of five political parties who failed to provide them with a set of audited accounts for 2019, in breach of statutory obligations.

Protests

In September 2019, party president Justin Barrett had a milkshake thrown over him when he along with other members the National Party were confronted by counter-protesters after unfurling a banner reading 'Ireland belongs to the Irish' in Galway.

During the COVID-19 pandemic in the Republic of Ireland, members of the National Party participated in several anti-mask and anti-lockdown protests. There were violent clashes at several events promoted and attended by party members in October 2020 and February 2021.

In July 2020, the National Party organised a protest against Minister for Children Roderic O'Gorman, who they accused of being sympathetic to paedophiles. During that protest, members of the party unfurled a banner and signs depicting a noose. Actor John Connors, who had attended the protest, subsequently issued a public apology (which O'Gorman accepted) in which Connors stated that he had allowed himself "to lead and be part of an online frenzy that cast hurtful and false assertions" on O'Gorman's character.

At an anti-mask protest held on 12 September 2020, a National Party member, Michael Quinn, assaulted LGBTQ+ activist Izzy Kamikaze with a wooden plank wrapped in the Irish flag, while she was observing the protest. In June 2021, Quinn pleaded guilty to assault using a weapon under Section 11 of the Firearms and Offensives Weapons Act, 1990. The party leadership has made no public comment on the assault or conviction. In the wake of the original assault, far-right social media accounts had claimed the victim had faked her injuries.

2022 Ard Fheis 
The party's annual Ard Fheis held in the Lough Erne Resort, County Fermanagh was disrupted by a group of far-left anti-fascist protestors who arrived by minibus, some of whom were armed with hammers and covered their faces with scarves and balaclavas. A fire extinguisher was also used by anti-fascists as a weapon. Two people were treated at the scene for their injuries and four others were taken to hospital following the incident. One protestor, Daniel Comerford from Dublin, was arrested and charged with having a hammer as an offensive weapon, causing criminal damage to a glass door, attempting to cause grievous bodily harm and affray.

The party Ard Fheis continued shortly after the disturbance. In his speech, deputy leader James Reynolds condemned the attack on the conference by "red communist thugs". In a subsequent statement, the party said: "The far-left in Ireland feel entitled to bludgeon people...Why? Because the NGO sector and media establishment give it moral sanction. The same people demand 'hate speech' legislation to create a two-tier justice system where they are on top."

Ideology and policies 
Descriptions of the National Party in the press have ranged from it being right wing to far-right. 
In August 2022, the Global Project against Hate and Extremism published a report on the growth of far-right and hate groups in Ireland. The report stated that "white nationalist, anti-LGBTQ+, anti-immigrant, and anti-lockdown groups seem to be coming together and echoing each other’s hateful rhetoric" and identified twelve far-right groups, including the National Party, that had experienced growth in recent years.  The National Party was included due to its anti-immigrant, anti-LGBTQ+, and white nationalist stances.

The party has a set of "Nine Principles", which espouse a nationalist, anti-abortion, Eurosceptic and anti-immigration platform. 

Barrett has called for a complete ban on Muslims entering Ireland and for greater vetting efforts to be made, stating that "all of them are potentially dangerous", though he later clarified that he does not believe Ireland needs a complete ban on Muslims entering the country. The party also favours racial profiling.

The party supports a renegotiation of Ireland's relationship with the EU, including a withdrawal from the Eurozone, but does not support exiting the European Union itself. They have described the EU as "dictatorial".

The party makes an irredentist claim on Northern Ireland; the first of its "nine principles" is copied from the old Article 2 of the Irish Constitution: "The National Party believes that the territory of Ireland consists of the whole island of Ireland, its islands and the territorial seas."

It advocates the reintroduction of the death penalty for "particularly heinous crimes", and opposes the decriminalisation of drugs.

The party opposes same-sex marriage, stating that it is "against gay marriage, but not gay people".  In 2016, Barrett declared marriage equality a "sham" and "not natural."

The party opposes allowing any law permitting abortion in Ireland, supports repeal of the Protection of Life During Pregnancy Act 2013, and refers to the X Case as "obtuse". The party endorsed a No vote in the abortion referendum, and campaigned against it through the Abortion Never campaign.

Barrett has spoken in support of a form of economic nationalism which he deemed "intelligent protectionism".

Election results

Dáil Éireann

See also
 Immigration Control Platform
 Identity Ireland
 Renua
 Irish Freedom Party

References

External links

2016 establishments in Ireland
Anti-abortion organisations in the Republic of Ireland
Anti-Islam political parties in Europe
Conservative parties in Ireland
Eurosceptic parties in Ireland
Far-right political parties
Far-right politics in Ireland
Irish nationalist parties
Opposition to same-sex marriage
Organizations that oppose LGBT rights
Political parties established in 2016
Political parties in the Republic of Ireland
Right-wing populist parties
Social conservative parties